Señorita República Dominicana 1979 was held on December 20, 1978. There were 28 candidates who competed for the national crown. The winner represented the Dominican Republic at the Miss Universe 1979 . The Señorita República Dominicana Mundo entered Miss World 1979.

Results

Señorita República Dominicana 1979 : Elizabeth García Javier (Samaná)
Señorita República Dominicana Mundo : Sabrina Alejandrina Brugal Tillan (Baoruco)
1st Runner Up : Carina Trujillo (Santiago)
2nd Runner Up : Mireya Cordoba (Puerto Plata)
3rd Runner Up : Antonieta Paz (Peravia)

Top 10

Lucia Abreu (Monte Cristi)
Casandra Montas (La Romana)
Josefina del Sol (Espaillat)
Julisa Duarte (San Pedro de Macorís)
Rita González (La Vega)

Special awards
 Miss Rostro Bello - Viena García (Samaná)
 Miss Photogenic (voted by press reporters) - Alejandra Fermin (Independencia)
 Miss Congeniality (voted by Miss Dominican Republic Universe contestants) - Aida Lozano (Valverde)
 Best Provincial Costume - Estefania Ramos (Dajabón)

Delegates

 Azua - Alejandra Viviana Lazaro Espinal
 Baoruco - Sabrina Alejandrina Brugal Tillan
 Barahona - Fatima Tatiana Sosa Martínez
 Dajabón - Estefania Carolina Ramos Acosta
 Distrito Nacional - Sandra Magdalena Castillo Reyes
 Duarte - Janet Desireth Santana Acosta
 Elías Piña - Diana del Carmen Rosario Toledo
 Espaillat - Josefina María del Sol Tomillo
 Independencia - Alejandra Edilia Fermin Gúzman
 La Altagracia - Carmen Antonieta Cruz Ureña
 La Romana - Casandra Joselyn Montas de Jesus
 La Vega - Rita Ynes González Sánchez
 María Trinidad Sánchez - Veronica Marina Ruiz Cabrera
 Monte Cristi - Lucia Teresa Abreu Fontana
 Pedernales - Laura Angelica Alvarado Sanz
 Peravia - Antonieta Margarita Paz Vargas
 Puerto Plata - María Mireya Cordoba Rosario
 Salcedo - María Valentina Alvarez Fabian
 Samaná - Viena Elizabeth García Javier
 Sánchez Ramírez - María Janibeth Rosado Xavier
 San Cristóbal - Laura Lucia Alonso Santos
 San Juan de la Maguana - Alba María Oviedo Prieto
 San Pedro de Macorís - María Julisa Duarte Castro
 Santiago - Carina Martina Trujillo Ramírez
 Santiago Rodríguez - Johanna Agnes Rosario Vargas
 Seibo - María India Marcano Domenech
 Santo Domingo de Guzmán - Ioana Emilia Ovieda Moro
 Valverde - Aida Agnes Lozano Carrasco

Miss Dominican Republic
1979 beauty pageants
1979 in the Dominican Republic